Nicolas Jeleff (born 7 May 1960) is a French water polo player. He competed at the 1988 Summer Olympics and the 1992 Summer Olympics.

References

External links
 

1960 births
Living people
French male water polo players
Olympic water polo players of France
Water polo players at the 1988 Summer Olympics
Water polo players at the 1992 Summer Olympics
Water polo players from Paris